TriMob LLC d/b/a 3Mob, formerly Utel is a telecommunications company in Ukraine. It is a subsidiary of Ukrtelecom, formerly government-owned fixed phone operator. Utel launched Ukraine's first commercial 3G cellular network based on the UMTS/HSDPA standard on November 1, 2007.

Until 2015 3Mob was the only network in Ukraine that provided UMTS 2100 service (other providers provided data services on EDGE and CDMA technology). It's 3G coverage exists only in Kyiv, free 2G/3G roaming is available in Vodafone-Ukraine network.

References

External links
 Official site 

Mobile phone companies of Ukraine
Companies based in Kyiv